Cayetano Martínez de Irujo y Fitz-James Stuart, 14th Count of Salvatierra, 4th Duke of Arjona (born 4 April 1963) is a Spanish equestrian. He competed in equestrian events at the 1992 Summer Olympics.

He is the current Count of Salvatierra and Duke of Arjona.

References

External links
 

1963 births
Living people
Spanish male equestrians
Olympic equestrians of Spain
Equestrians at the 1992 Summer Olympics
Sportspeople from Madrid